Twin Lake is a lake in Alberta.

See also
List of lakes of Alberta

Twin Lake
County of Wetaskiwin No. 10